The 22461/22462 Shri Shakti Express is an AC Superfast Express run by Indian Railways between  and  railway stations in India.

Indian Prime Minister Narendra Modi had on 4 July 2014 flagged off this train from Katra Vaishno Devi while commissioning the 25-km-long Udhampur-Katra line, built at an estimated cost of Rs 1,132.75 crore.

At the function, the Prime Minister had named the train Shri Shakti Express and said such services are planned from major cities in the country. The Vaishno Devi shrine attracts about 10 million pilgrims annually. The Train started its regular commercial operations from July 14, 2014.

The train connectivity to Katra is part of the ambitious Kashmir rail link project marking region's rail connectivity with the rest of the country. The train traverses through eight tunnels and 29 minor bridges en route Udhampur – Katra track.

Train info

Route

References

External links
Shri Shakti Express (New Delhi to Shri Maa Vaishno Devi Katra)
Shri Shakti Express (Shri Maa Vaishno Devi Katra to New Delhi)

Transport in Delhi
Transport in Katra, Jammu and Kashmir
AC Express (Indian Railways) trains
Rail transport in Jammu and Kashmir
Rail transport in Haryana
Rail transport in Punjab, India
Rail transport in Delhi
Railway services introduced in 2014